Arthur Peronneau Hayne (March 12, 1788January 7, 1867) was a United States senator from South Carolina who belonged to the Democratic Party.

Biography
Born in Charleston, March 12, 1788; Hayne was the son of William Hayne, a lowland planter, and his wife Elizabeth Peronneau. Hayne was of English and French Huguenot descent. He pursued classical studies, engaged in business, and served in the War of 1812 as a first lieutenant at Sackets Harbor on Lake Ontario, major of cavalry on the St. Lawrence, and inspector general in 1814. He was brevetted lieutenant colonel for gallant conduct at New Orleans. He studied law with Hon. Thomas Duncan in Carlisle, Pennsylvania, was admitted to the bar and practiced, and served in the Florida War as commander of the Tennessee Volunteers and retired from the military in 1820. 
Hayne was a member of the South Carolina House of Representatives and was United States naval agent in the Mediterranean for five years. He declined the Belgian mission as ambassador, and was appointed to the United States Senate to fill the vacancy caused by the death of Josiah J. Evans and served from May 11, 1858, to December 2, 1858; he was not a candidate to fill the vacancy. Hayne died in Charleston in 1867; interment was in St. Michael's Churchyard, Charleston.

Military career
Arthur Hayne began his military career in 1807. When the frigate Chesapeake was attacked, he secured a commission as first lieutenant in a regiment of light dragoons, commanded by Colonel Wade Hampton of Revolutionary war fame. In 1809, he was sent by Hampton to Mississippi, where he laid the Foundation for his later career. He fought in the battle of Sacket's Harbor, was brevetted major for gallantry in action, accompanied General Wilkinson down the St. Lawrence in the contemplated attack on Montreal and also served with General Brown. In 1814 he became Inspector General, with orders to join General Andrew Jackson in the Creek nation. In the absence of Colonel Butler, he also acted as adjutant general. Jackson sent him to Fort Montgomery to organize forces for an attack upon Pensacola. In the storming of the city, Colonel Hayne was one of the first to take possession of an enemy battery under heavy fire. After its fall, he was placed in charge of the city. In the famous Battle of New Orleans, Hayne selected the site for Jackson's defense and had much to do with repulsing the British and saving the city, as did Major Wade Hampton of Columbia. After the battle, Jackson sent Hayne to Washington to secure additional troops for the continued defense of the city, not realizing the war had ended. During the war, he was thrice brevetted for bravery.

Family
Arthur Hayne was the older brother of Robert Young Hayne, also a U.S. Senator and Governor of South Carolina; famous for the Webster-Hayne Debate over States' rights and held over several days in the U.S. Senate in 1830. He was a cousin of Isaac Hayne, hanged by the British during the Revolution, and uncle of the poet and editor Paul Hamilton Hayne. Arthur Hayne married Frances Gibson Duncan, daughter of Hon. Thomas Duncan of Carlisle, Pennsylvania, Justice of the Pennsylvania Supreme Court (1817–1827). He married second, Elizabeth Laura Alston, daughter of William Alston of Charleston, South Carolina. His only child Frances Duncan Hayne married Lloyd James Beall, a former United States Army officer from Rhode Island who sided with the Confederacy and served as Commandant of the Confederate States Marine Corps.

References

External links

 
 

1788 births
1867 deaths
Democratic Party members of the South Carolina House of Representatives
American people of the Seminole Wars
United States Army personnel of the War of 1812
Inspectors General of the United States Army
Democratic Party United States senators from South Carolina
19th-century American politicians
Burials at St. Michael's Churchyard (Charleston)
People of the Creek War